The 2022–23 Slovak Extraliga season is the 30th season of the Slovak Extraliga, the highest ice hockey league in Slovakia.

Regular season

Standings
Each team played 50 games: playing each of the other eleven teams four times – 2x at home, 2x away (44 games) and during the Christmas holidays (20.12.2022 – 4.1.2023) each team played the inserted matches within the region 1x at home, 1x away = 6 games. 

Points were awarded for each game, where three points are awarded for winning in regulation time, two points for winning in overtime or shootout, one point for losing in overtime or shootout, and zero points for losing in regulation time. At the end of the regular season, the team that finished with the most points was crowned the league champion.

Statistics

Scoring leaders

The following shows the top ten players who led the league in points, at the conclusion of the regular season.

Leading goaltenders
The following shows the top ten goaltenders who led the league in goals against average, provided that they have played at least 40% of their team's minutes, at the conclusion of matches played on 20 January 2023.

Playoffs
Ten teams qualify for the playoffs: the top six teams in the regular season have a bye to the quarterfinals, while teams ranked seventh to tenth meet each other (7 versus 10, 8 versus 9) in a preliminary playoff round.

Bracket

Wild card round

Quarterfinals

Semifinals

Final rankings

References

External links
Official website

Slovak Extraliga seasons
Slovak
2022–23 in Slovak ice hockey leagues